William P. Snyder (November 7, 1916 – Fond du Lac, Wisconsin, May 11, 2011) was an American pianist, bandleader and songwriter of the 1950s.

Snyder studied under Moriz Rosenthal in Paris and served in the Air Force during the Second World War. Snyder first had a massive hit with Lorenz Hart's "Bewitched, Bothered and Bewildered" in 1950. The song reached the top position on the Cash Box list of "The Nation's Top Ten Juke Box Tunes." Through the 1950s, Snyder was America's most recorded light music pianist with nine gold and one platinum awards for his singles and albums.

Song compositions
Chicago, the City of Today
Riding the Off Beat
Window Shopping
Cafe Conversation
Ballerina in Distress
Choppin' up Chopin

References

External links
 Bill Snyder recordings at the Discography of American Historical Recordings.

1916 births
2011 deaths
People from Fond du Lac, Wisconsin
Musicians from Wisconsin
20th-century American pianists
American male pianists
20th-century American male musicians
United States Army Air Forces personnel of World War II
American expatriates in France